Chelsea Jaensch (born 6 January 1985 in Adelaide) is an Australian athlete specialising in the long jump. She made her major competition debut at the age of thirty-one at the 2016 World Indoor Championships finishing eleventh. She returned to competition in 2012 after a seven-year break to focus on education and playing netball. She represented her country at the 2016 Summer Olympics in Rio de Janeiro finishing 17th and not qualifying for the final.

Her personal bests in the event are 6.70 metres outdoors (-0.1 m/s, Canberra 2016) and 6.38 metres indoors (Portland 2016). Chelsea is as well a full-time radiographer.

Competition record

References

External links
Official website

1985 births
Living people
Athletes from Adelaide
Australian female long jumpers
Athletes (track and field) at the 2016 Summer Olympics
Olympic athletes of Australia